"On the Historical Unity of Russians and Ukrainians" is an essay by Russian president Vladimir Putin published on 12 July 2021.

It was published shortly after the end of the first of two buildups of Russian forces preceding the full-scale invasion of Ukraine in February 2022. In the essay, Putin describes his views on Ukraine and Ukrainians.

According to RBK Daily, the essay is included in the list of mandatory works to be studied by the Russian military. In 2021 this essay was also published as a book with no author indicated.

Contents 
In the essay, Putin argues that Russians and Ukrainians, along with Belarusians, are one people, belonging to what has historically been known as the triune Russian nation. To support the claim, he describes in length his views on the history of Russia and Ukraine, concluding that Russians and Ukrainians share a common heritage and destiny.

Noting the large number of ethnic Russians in Ukraine, Putin compares "the formation of an ethnically pure Ukrainian state, aggressive towards Russia" to a use of weapons of mass destruction against Russians.

Putin openly questions the legitimacy of Ukraine's contemporary borders. According to Putin, the modern-day Ukraine occupies historically Russian lands, and is an "anti-Russia project" created by external forces since the seventeenth century, and of administrative and political decisions made during the Soviet Union. He also discusses the Russo-Ukrainian War, maintaining that "Kiev simply does not need Donbas".

Putin places blame for the current crisis on foreign plots and anti-Russian conspiracies. According to Putin, the decisions of the Ukrainian government are driven by a Western plot against Russia as well as by "followers of Bandera".

Putin ends the lengthy essay by asserting Russia's role in modern Ukrainian affairs.

Follow-ups 
A few days later, the Kremlin website published an interview with Putin about the article.

Several months later, Dmitry Medvedev, the deputy chairman of the Security Council of Russia, also published an article on Ukraine. In it, he agrees with Putin's essay, and declares that there will be no negotiations with Ukraine until the Ukrainian government is replaced. The article, endorsed by the Kremlin, was criticized for its denigrating and antisemitic tone.

Vladislav Surkov, the personal adviser (2013–2020) of Putin, also published an article concerning Ukraine and other ex-USSR territories. In the article, he questions the legitimacy of the western border of Russia (including the borders with Ukraine and the Baltic states), and argues that Russia should abolish the "wicked peace" that keeps it confined by the borders.

In a speech on 21 February 2022, following the escalation in the 2021–2022 Russo-Ukrainian crisis, Putin said that "modern Ukraine was wholly and fully created by Bolshevik, communist Russia". Sarah Rainsford wrote in BBC News that Putin's speech was "rewriting Ukraine's history", and that his focus on the country was "obsessive". Vitaly Chervonenko from the BBC noted how carefully Putin kept silent about the independent Ukrainian state formations of 1917–1920 and Kyiv's war with Lenin's Bolshevik government, whose purpose was to include Ukraine in Bolshevik Russia.

Plokhiy recalled that in 1922, Lenin took away even formal independence from Ukraine by integrating it into the Soviet Union.

The article "The Advance of Russia and of a New World" by Petr Akopov was briefly published in several Russian state news sites on 26 February 2022, two days after Russian forces openly invaded Ukrainian-controlled territory, but was soon deleted. Its original publication on RIA News at precisely 8:00 a.m. suggests it may have been automatically published by mistake. The article celebrates the "gathering the Russian world, the Russian people together—in its entirety of Great Russians, Belarusians and Little Russians", and Vladimir Putin's historic responsibility for "resolution of the Ukrainian question". 

The same state-owned RIA News published another article in April 2022, this time without any backtracking. Titled "What Russia should do with Ukraine", the article openly accused the entire Ukrainian nation of being Nazis who must wiped out and in some cases re-educated.

On 29 March 2022, Rossiyskaya Gazeta, the official government gazette of the Russian government, published an article that claims that European elites support the Ukrainian Nazis because of their bitterness over the loss in the Second World War. According to the article, Ukraine must become a part of Russia, even if Ukrainians are against it.

Reactions 
Volodymyr Zelenskyy, the president of Ukraine, criticized the essay on 13 July, comparing Putin's view on the brotherhood between the nations with the story of Cain and Abel. Former president Petro Poroshenko also sharply criticized the essay, describing it as a counterpart of Hitler's Sudetenland speech. Former president of Estonia Toomas Hendrik Ilves similarly likened it to Hitler's 1938 rhetoric justifying the partition of Czechoslovakia. Ukraine's envoy to United Nations Sergiy Kyslytsya commented, "fables about the 'one people' ... have been refuted in Donbas battlefields".

According to the Institute of History of Ukraine, the essay represents the historical views of the Russian Empire. The Ukrainian World Congress compares Putin's view of Ukraine "as a non-nation" to that of Joseph Stalin under whose watch at least five million Ukrainians perished during the Holodomor.

The Carnegie Endowment for International Peace called the essay a "historical, political, and security predicate for invading [Ukraine]". The Stockholm Free World Forum senior fellow Anders Åslund branded the essay as "one step short of a declaration of war." According to Foreign Policy, the essay is a "key guide to the historical stories that shape Putin's and many Russian's attitudes". Historian Timothy Snyder has described Putin's ideas as imperialism. British journalist Edward Lucas described it as historical revisionism. Other observers have noted that the Russian leadership has a distorted view of modern Ukraine and its history.

In Romania, a part of the essay caused outrage. The fragment in question describes how, in 1918, the Kingdom of Romania had "occupied" (and not united with) the geographical region of Bessarabia, part of which is now in Ukraine. Romanian media outlets such as Adevărul and Digi24 commented on Putin's statements and criticized them. Remarks were also made regarding Northern Bukovina, another former Romanian territory now part of Ukraine. , then a deputy of Romania, also replied to Putin's essay, declaring that Bessarabia was not occupied but "reattached" and "reincorporated" following "democratic processes and historical realities". Muraru also commented on Northern Bukovina.

A report by 35 legal and genocide experts cited Putin's essay as part of "laying the groundwork for incitement to genocide: denying the existence of the Ukrainian group".

See also 

 Address concerning the events in Ukraine
 Where have you been for eight years?
 On conducting a special military operation
 What Russia should do with Ukraine
 Putinism
 Rashism
 Russian nationalism
 Pan-Slavism

References

External links

2020s essays
2021 in Russia
2021 in Ukraine
Essays by Vladimir Putin
Imperialism
Russian nationalism
Russian irredentism
Historical negationism
Propaganda in Russia
War in Donbas
Prelude to the 2022 Russian invasion of Ukraine
Anti-Ukrainian sentiment in Russia
Propaganda in Russia related to the 2022 Russian invasion of Ukraine
Russia–Ukraine relations